Jerry Williams (born January 2, 1979) is an American former professional basketball player and current head basketball coach for the Newfoundland Rogues (Canada) and former Head coach for the ABA Jacksonville Giants in Jacksonville, Florida. He had a distinguished college and European career, and played in the American Basketball Association (ABA) for 2 seasons , from 2007-2008. He played for the ABA Jacksonville Jam.  A 6'6" shooting guard/small forward from Cumberland College, he was selected to the 2007 ABA All-Star Game.

Williams is the only Head Coach in ABA history to win a 3 peat championship in his first 3 years as Head Coach. Williams also was able to 4 peat in  2021 after the season ending in 2020 due to Covid-19, where the Giants were 25 and 1 heading into the playoffs. 

From 2002 to 2007, Williams played in the British Basketball League. He was named Player of the Year in 2004, after a season in which he averaged 23.3 points per game for the Scottish Rocks.  Jerry's nickname is "Mouse."

He is the brother of NFL superstar Rashean Mathis of the Jacksonville Jaguars.

Hall of Fame
February 2013, Williams was inducted into his Cumberland College Hall of Fame.

References

Miller on Sports. "Williams wins second game of AAU National Championship". milleronsports.com

Living people
American expatriate basketball people in France
American expatriate basketball people in Italy
American expatriate basketball people in the United Kingdom
Basketball players from Jacksonville, Florida
Shooting guards
Small forwards
Sheffield Sharks players
Glasgow Rocks players
1979 births
American men's basketball players
American expatriate sportspeople in Scotland
American expatriate sportspeople in England